"Familiar Drugs" is a single released by Canadian band Alexisonfire on 15 February 2019, their first release of original music in almost 10 years. Lead Vocalist George Pettit described the song as "being at a point in your life where you know you can make a change yet choosing to not make that change."

The music video was released on 16 April 2019, directed by Michael Maxxis and was shot using VHS tape and cellphones.

Personnel
 George Pettit – lead vocals
 Dallas Green – rhythm guitar, vocals
 Wade MacNeil – lead guitar, backing vocals
 Chris Steele – bass guitar
 Jordan Hastings – drums, percussion

Chart performance

External links

References

Alexisonfire songs
2019 singles
2019 songs
Sludge metal songs
Songs written by Dallas Green (musician)